Jean E. Rhodes (born c. 1961) is an American psychologist and author. She is the Frank L. Boyden Professor of Psychology at the University of Massachusetts, Boston. She is the director of the Center for Evidence-Based Mentoring at the University of Massachusetts, Boston.

Career 
Rhodes graduated Phi Beta Kappa from the University of Vermont in 1983. She went on to earn her Ph.D. in clinical psychology with distinction from DePaul University and completed her clinical internship in 1988 and a postdoctoral clinical position in 1989 at the University of Chicago.

Rhodes was hired as an assistant of psychology at the University of Illinois Urbana-Champaign in 1989, where she was promoted to associate professor with tenure in 1995.

Rhodes currently serves as the Frank L. Boyden Professor of Psychology in the clinical psychology division at the University of Massachusetts, Boston. Throughout her career, Rhodes has published four books and over 200 chapters and articles. Rhodes specializes in the study of youth mentoring and is noted for her theories of mentoring relationship process and formal mentoring relationships.

Awards and recognition 
At the University of Massachusetts, Rhodes has received the Vice Chancellor's Teaching Scholar Award, the Distinguished Academic Leadership and Outstanding Service to the Students Award, and the Chancellor's Distinguished Scholar Award. Rhodes is a fellow of the American Psychological Association and the Society for Research and Community Action. Previously, she was a member of two MacArthur Foundation research networks, a Robert Wood Johnson health policy fellow, and both a faculty scholar and a distinguished fellow of the William T. Grant Foundation.

Personal 
Rhodes grew up in Allendale, New Jersey, and currently lives in Boston, Massachusetts. She has been married to MIT Professor K. Dane Wittrup since 1990 and they have three children, Audrey, Ian, and Thomas.

References 

Year of birth missing (living people)
Living people
American women psychologists
American clinical psychologists
People from Allendale, New Jersey
People from Boston
University of Vermont alumni
DePaul University alumni
University of Massachusetts Boston faculty
American writers
American women academics
21st-century American women